"Can't Get Enough of You Baby" is a song written by Denny Randell and Sandy Linzer and first recorded by the Four Seasons in 1965 for their album Working My Way Back to You and More Great New Hits. The protopunk band ? and the Mysterians recorded it in 1967 for their second album Action. Their version reached No. 56 on the Billboard Hot 100 when it was released as a single.

Smash Mouth version

The song was covered by American rock band Smash Mouth for the soundtrack to the 1998 film Can't Hardly Wait and was also released as the lead single from the band's second studio album, Astro Lounge (1999).

Music video
The music video takes place at a school dance in a gymnasium. First, we see a lady put a film reel into an old projector. The band immediately begins to perform once the projector starts and it shows a quick fly-by montage of the band performing and the students dancing. Then, other shots of students dancing, which includes a girl dancing on a basketball hoop. Afterwards, we see the band performing while the students continue to dance. Another fly-by montage follows, including scenes from the film Can't Hardly Wait.  Then, the scenes between the music video and the film alter. Suddenly, while a man sings with his woman off-key, the band stops and Harwell tells him, "Dude, this is my show!" Shortly after, the band continues playing as more shots between the film and the music video continue. Then, the projector shows some scenes from the film on a small screen with a giant American flag in the background. A girl in the crowd notices Harwell, which then leads to her coming on stage to dance with him. The music video ends with the projector shutting off.

Charts

Weekly charts

Year-end charts

Certifications

Release history

Other versions
The Toys recorded a version of the song for their 1966 album, The Toys Sing "A Lover's Concerto" and "Attack!".
The Colourfield recorded a version of the song for their 1985 album, Virgins and Philistines. This version was used in the 1999 film 10 Things I Hate About You.

References

1965 songs
1967 singles
1998 singles
Songs written by Sandy Linzer
Songs written by Denny Randell
The Four Seasons (band) songs
? and the Mysterians songs
Smash Mouth songs
The Colourfield songs
Cameo-Parkway Records singles
Music videos directed by McG
Song recordings produced by Eric Valentine